Andor Toth, Jr. (1948–2002) was an American cellist in the Central European, Berlin, and Hungarian traditions.

Toth Jr. was the son of the violinist Andor Toth, with whom he collaborated in the Toth Duo and the New Hungarian Quartet. His teachers were Gábor Rejtő and George Neikrug. He studied cello with Neikrug at the University of Texas before leaving for an appointment as solo cellist with the San Francisco Symphony under conductor Josef Krips.

When he died of esophageal cancer on September 24, 2002, he was Professor of Cello at the Oberlin Conservatory in Ohio, where he had taught for 30 years.

Career
In 1972, when Toth Jr. joined the Oberlin faculty, his father, who was also on the faculty, formed the New Hungarian Quartet.

In 1982, Toth formed the Oberlin Trio with Professor of Pianoforte Joseph Schwartz and violin faculty member Stephen Clapp.

Selected discography 
Arkiv Music: Duos For Violin And Cello / Toth Duo
Duo for Violin and Cello, Op. 7 by Zoltán Kodály 
Duo for Violin and Cello no 1, H 157 by Bohuslav Martinů
Sonata for Violin and Cello by Maurice Ravel

Arkiv Music VoxBox CDX 5022: Schubert, String Quartets / New Hungarian Quartet
Andor Toth (violin), Richard Young (violin), Denes Koromzay (viola), Andor Toth Jr. (cello) 
String Quartet No. 13 in A minor, D 804/Op. 29 no 1 "Rosamunde" 
String Quartet No. 14 in D minor, D 810 "Death and the Maiden"
String Quartet No. 15 in G major, D 887/Op. 161
Quartettsatz in C minor, D 703/Op. posthumous

VoxBox (Classical) CD3X 3012: Beethoven, The Middle Quartets / New Hungarian Quartet
Andor Toth (violin), Richard Young (violin), Denes Koromzay (viola), Andor Toth Jr. (cello) 
String Quartet No. 7 in F major ("Rasumovsky 1"), Op. 59/1 
String Quartet No. 8 in E minor ("Rasumovsky 2"), Op. 59/2
String Quartet No. 9 in C major ("Rasumovsky 3"), Op. 59/3
String Quartet No. 10 in E-flat major ("Harp"), Op. 74 
String Quartet No. 11 in F minor ("Serioso"), Op. 95

VoxBox (Classical) CDX 3031: Debussy and Ravel Quartets / New Hungarian Quartet
Second CD of 3 CD Set. Andor Toth (violin), Richard Young (violin), Denes Koromzay (viola), Andor Toth Jr. (cello)
String Quartet (Debussy) in G minor, Op. 10
String Quartet (Ravel)

References

External links
Obituary, Oberlin Conservatory

American classical cellists
American music educators
1948 births
2002 deaths
American people of Hungarian descent
20th-century American musicians
20th-century classical musicians
20th-century cellists